Ethanedisulfonic acid is a diprotic sulfonic acid, with pKa values of -1.46 and -2.06, making it a very strong acid.  When used in pharmaceutical formulations, the salts with the active ingredient are known as edisylates.

See also
Methanedisulfonic acid
1,3-Propanedisulfonic acid

References

Sulfonic acids